John Ker, 3rd Duke of Roxburghe, KG, KT, PC (23 April 1740 – 1804) was a Scottish nobleman and bibliophile.

Early life
Born in Hanover Square, London, on 23 April 1740, Ker succeeded his father to become the 3rd Duke of Roxburghe in 1755. During his Grand Tour in 1761 he fell in love with Duchess Christiane of Mecklenburg, oldest daughter of Duke Charles Louis Frederick of Mecklenburg. This would have been a perfect match of social equals. Shortly afterwards a younger sister, Charlotte of Mecklenburg-Strelitz, became engaged to King George III. It was considered bad etiquette for an elder sister to marry someone of lower rank than a younger sister. For whatever reason, both John Ker and Christina separated and remained single for the rest of their lives. If George III recognised the sacrifice that Ker had made, it was rewarded with a high position at court. He was Lord of the Bedchamber from 1767, was appointed a Knight of the Thistle in 1768. In 1796 he was appointed Groom of the Stole and made a Privy Counsellor. He was appointed a Knight of the Garter in 1801.

Bibliophile
While in Italy, Ker saw a first edition of Boccaccio's Decameron, often called the Valdarfers edition. This was a fabled book, which many said did not exist. He paid 100 guineas for it and showed it to his friends in London to huge acclaim. For the next 40 years he collected ancient and curious books, particularly editions of Shakespeare's works and other works which merely mentioned Shakespeare. At his death in 1804 there were 10,000 items. Most were books, but there were also pamphlets and broadside ballad sheets. His library was auctioned in 1812, leading to the formation of the Roxburghe Club. His collection of ballads were later published as the Roxburghe Ballads.

He died unmarried and childless, and the titles Earl Ker and Baron Ker, which had been created for his father in 1722 in the Peerage of Great Britain, became extinct. His cousin William Bellenden, 7th Lord Bellenden succeeded to the dukedom and all of its other subsidiary titles.

In popular culture

In Jonathan Strange and Mr. Norrell, a 2004 novel by British writer Susanna Clarke, the Duke's affection for the Queen's sister and their subsequent separation are mentioned, and made a premise for an important aspect of the story. One of the title characters, Gilbert Norrell, had a longstanding wish to examine the books of the Duke's library, believing there to be magical texts within. The Duke, being a bibliophile and rich, saw no reason to allow Mr. Norrell the opportunity, and so upon the Duke's death, the new Duke puts the library up for sale in order to pay off court debts. The Duke's library contained several extremely rare and valuable tomes, which Mr. Norrell purchases at auction, causing an increase in friction between himself and Jonathan Strange.

Ancestry

Notes

Bibliography
Dibdin, Rev. Thomas Frognall. Reminiscences of a Literary Life. 2 vols. (Vol I, Vol II). London: John Major, 1836.

External links

1740 births
1804 deaths
Anglo-Scots
Ballads
3
Knights of the Garter
Knights of the Thistle
Lord-Lieutenants of Roxburghshire
Members of the Privy Council of Great Britain
People from Westminster
Scottish politicians
Scottish publishers (people)
Scottish scholars and academics
English book and manuscript collectors
John Ker, 3rd Duke of Roxburghe
Grooms of the Stool
Court of George III of the United Kingdom